Sally Ann Worrell  is a British archaeologist specialising in Romano-British material culture.

Career
Worrell is a Senior Research Associate at University College London, having joined the university in May 2003. Worrell worked as the Finds Liaison Officer for Hampshire for the Portable Antiquities Scheme before taking up the role of National Finds Adviser (Prehistoric, Iron Age, and Roman Artefacts) there. Whilst working as FLO for Hampshire she appeared in an episode of Time Team.

Since 2003 she has contributed to the annual reporting of Romano-British metal detected finds to the journal Britannia.

She was elected as a Fellow of the Society of Antiquaries of London on 3 March 2007.

Select publications
Worrell, S. 1997. Marton, North Lincolnshire: a Romano-British settlement in its context.
  
Hill, J. D., La Niece, S., Spence, A. and Worrell, S. 2004. "The Winchester Hoard: a find of unique Iron Age gold jewellery from southern England", Antiquaries Journal 84, 1-22.

References

Living people
Year of birth missing (living people)
Place of birth missing (living people)
Fellows of the Society of Antiquaries of London
British archaeologists
British women archaeologists
20th-century archaeologists
21st-century archaeologists
Women classical scholars
People associated with the Portable Antiquities Scheme